Moseley House Museum is a house museum located in Eatonville, Florida. The house is the second oldest structure in the town, constructed in 1888. The house was owned by Jim and Matilda Clark Moseley, Matilda was the niece of Eatonville's founder and first mayor. Author Zora Neale Hurston was a friend of Matilda and often visited the house. The house was restored and opened as a museum in 2000. It currently exhibits early Eatonville memorabilia.

References 

2000 establishments in Florida
Buildings and structures in Orange County, Florida
Historic house museums in Florida
Museums established in 2000
Houses completed in 1888
Zora Neale Hurston